Tuanyida Square Station is a station of Guangzhou Metro Line 6. It is located in the Yuexiu District of Guangzhou and started operation on 28December 2013.

Station layout

Exits

References

Railway stations in China opened in 2013
Guangzhou Metro stations in Yuexiu District